Lobatus is a genus of very large sea snails, marine gastropod mollusks in the family Strombidae, the true conchs. Some of the species within this genus were previously placed in the genus Eustrombus.

Species
Living and fossil species within the genus Lobatus include:

Lobatus peruvianus (Swainson, 1823)
Lobatus raninus (Gmelin, 1791)
†Lobatus dominator (Pilsbry, 1917)
†Lobatus galliformis (Pilsbry, 1917)
†Lobatus haitensis (Sowerby, 1850)
†Lobatus leidyi (Heilprin, 1887)
†Lobatus vokesae Landau et al., 2008
†Lobatus williamsi (Olson & Petit, 1964)

Species brought into synonymy include:

Lobatus costatus (Gmelin, 1791) accepted as Macrostrombus costatus (Gmelin, 1791)
Lobatus galeatus (Swainson, 1823) accepted as Titanostrombus galeatus (Swainson, 1823)
Lobatus gallus (Linnaeus, 1758) accepted as Aliger gallus (Linnaeus, 1758)
Lobatus gigas (Linnaeus, 1758) accepted as Aliger gigas (Linnaeus, 1758)
Lobatus goliath (Schröter, 1805) accepted as Titanostrombus goliath (Schröter, 1805)
Lobatus magolecciai (Macsotay & Campos, 2001) accepted as Lobatus raninus (Gmelin, 1791) (junior subjective synonym)

References

Further reading 
 George H. Darcy (September 1981). Annotated Bibliography of the Conch Genus Strombus (Gastropoda, Strombidae) in the Western Atlantic Ocean. NOAA TECHNICAL REPORT NMFS SSRF—748. U.S. DEPARTMENT OF COMMERCE, Malcolm Baldrlge, Secretary; National Oceanic and Atmospheric Administration, John v. Byrne, Administrator; National Marine Fisheries Service.

Strombidae